Team Differdange–Geba is a continental cycling team, based in Luxembourg. The team participates in UCI Continental Circuits races.

Major wins

2006
GP Demy-Cars, Fredrik Johansson
Stage 3 Okolo Slovenska, Søren Nissen
2007
Stages 2 & 5 La Tropicale Amissa Bongo, Stefan Heiny
Stage 3 Tour de Taiwan, Christian Knørr
Stage 1 Rhône-Alpes Isère Tour, Hakan Nilsson
 Time Trial Championships, Christian Poos
Stage 2 Tour de Korea, Hannes Blank
2008
Stage 4 Jelajah Malaysia, Fredrik Johansson
Stage 4 Ronde de l'Oise, Sébastien Harbonnier
2009
Stage 4 Flèche du Sud, Fredrik Johansson
Tartu GP, Hannes Blank
Grand Prix de la ville de Pérenchies, Robert Retschke
Grand Prix des Marbriers, Robert Retschke
2010
Grand Prix de la ville de Nogent-sur-Oise, Vytautas Kaupas
Prologue (ITT) Flèche du Sud, Jempy Drucker
Stage 4 Flèche du Sud, Stefan Cohnen
 Road Race Championships, Vytautas Kaupas
Ronde Pévéloise, Frank Dressler
2011
 Time Trial Championships, Christian Poos
Stage 4 Sibiu Cycling Tour, Christian Poos
2012
Paris–Mantes-en-Yvelines, Alex Meenhorst
2013
Stage 3 Tour de Singkarak, Johan Coenen
Stage 1 Tour de Guadeloupe, Janis Dakteris
Stage 2a Tour de Guadeloupe, Johan Coenen
Stages 4 & 9 Tour de Guadeloupe, Diego Milán
Stage 5 Tour de Guadeloupe, César Bihel
2014
Stage 2 Vuelta a la Independencia Nacional, Janis Dakteris
 Time Trial Championships, Augusto Sánchez
 Road Race Championships, Diego Milán
Stage 2a Tour de Guadeloupe, Johan Coenen
Stage 5 Tour de Guadeloupe, Diego Milán
Stage 8a Tour de Guadeloupe, Janis Dakteris
Stage 1b Giro del Friuli-Venezia Giulia, Janis Dakteris
2015
 Time Trial Championships, Krisztián Lovassy
Overall Tour de Hongrie, Tom Thill
2017
 Road Race Championships, Krisztián Lovassy
Stage 3a Tour of Szeklerland, Cristian Raileanu

Team roster

References

External links
 

UCI Continental Teams (Europe)
Cycling teams based in Luxembourg
Cycling teams established in 2006